Winter is  a modern given name of English origin given in reference to the season.

The name has been in regular use across the English-speaking world. It has ranked among the top 1,000 names for newborn girls in England and Wales since 2014 and among the top 300 names since 2020. It has ranked among the top 1,000 names for newborn girls in the United States since 2012 and among the top 400 names since 2018. It was the 324th most popular name for newborn American girls in 2021, when 999 girls were given the name in that country. The name is also in use for boys. There were 70 American boys named Winter in 2021. Spelling variant Wynter is also well-used and was the 344th  most popular name for newborn American girls in 2021, with 917 uses. There were 18 American boys named Wynter in 2021. Elaborations of the name are also in use, with eight American girls in 2020 called Wynterrose and six American girls called Winterrose.

The popularity of the name coincides with the increase in usage of other season names for girls such as Autumn and Summer as well as other names inspired by the natural world. The name has also been used by celebrities for their children and for characters in books and films, which might have brought it to the attention of parents.

Notes